Nunneley is a surname. Notable people with the surname include:

James S. Nunneley (1910–1967), American politician
John Nunneley (1922–2013), British Army officer and businessman
Kathleen Nunneley (1872–1956), New Zealand tennis player and librarian

See also
Nunnely
Nunnally
Nunnelee